Alessandra Borchi (born ) is an Italian female  track cyclist, and part of the national team. She competed in the team pursuit event at the 2009 UCI Track Cycling World Championships.

References

External links
 Profile at cyclingarchives.com

1983 births
Living people
Italian track cyclists
Italian female cyclists
Place of birth missing (living people)
People from Quarrata
Sportspeople from the Province of Pistoia
Cyclists from Tuscany